Rangawali Dam, is an earthfill dam on Rangawali river near Dhule but in Nandurbar district in the state of Maharashtra in India.

Specifications

Purpose
 Irrigation

See also
 Dams in Maharashtra
 List of reservoirs and dams in India

References

Dams in Nandurbar district
Dams completed in 1982
1982 establishments in Maharashtra